The 1929 Dartmouth Indians football team was an American football team that represented Dartmouth College as an independent during the 1929 college football season. In their third season under head coach Jackson Cannell, the Indians compiled a 7–2 record. Ellsworth Armstrong was the team captain.

Al Marsters was the team's leading scorer, with 109 points, from 16 touchdowns and 13 kicked extra points.

Dartmouth played its home games at Memorial Field on the college campus in Hanover, New Hampshire.

Schedule

References

Dartmouth
Dartmouth Big Green football seasons
Dartmouth Indians football